Huntstown may refer to the following places:

Huntstown, Ohio, ghost town in Putnam County, Ohio
Huntstown and Littlepace, suburb of Dublin